Hudak Peak is a peak rising to  immediately south of Plummer Glacier in the Douglas Peaks of the Heritage Range, in the Ellsworth Mountains of Antarctica. It was named by the Advisory Committee on Antarctic Names in 2004 after Curtis M. Hudak, a geologist on the United States Antarctic Research Program 1979–80 Ellsworth Mountains expedition.

See also
 Mountains in Antarctica

References

Ellsworth Mountains
Mountains of Ellsworth Land